Palladaha is a census town in Barrackpore I CD Block of Barrackpore subdivision in North 24 Parganas district in the Indian state of West Bengal. It is a part of Kolkata Urban Agglomeration.

Geography

Location
Palladaha, Nagdaha, Palashi and Srotribati (OG) form an urban cluster east of Kanchrapara. Jetia, Nanna (OG) and Chakla (OG) form another urban cluster south of Kanchrapara.

96% of the population of Barrackpore subdivision (partly presented in the map alongside) live in urban areas. In 2011, it had a density of population of 10,967 per km2 The subdivision has 16 municipalities and 24 census towns.

For most of the cities/ towns information regarding density of population is available in the Infobox. Population data is not available for neighbourhoods. It is available for the entire municipal area and thereafter ward-wise.

All places marked on the map are linked in the full-screen map.

Police station
Naihati police station under Barrackpore Police Commissionerate has jurisdiction over Naihati municipal area and Barrackpore I CD Block, including Barrackpur Cantonment Board.

Demographics
 India census, Palladaha had a population of 5,994; of this, 3,052 are male, 2,942 female. It has an average literacy rate of 77.01%, higher than the national average of 74.04%.

Infrastructure
As per the District Census Handbook 2011, Palladaha covered an area of 1.7731 km2. Amongst the medical facilities it had were 3 charitable hospital/ nursing homes and 21 medicine shops. Amongst the educational facilities it had were 3 primary schools, and the other nearest schools were available 4 km away at Kanchrapara.

Transport
Palladaha is beside Kalyani Expressway.

The Kanchrapara railway station on the Sealdah-Ranaghat line is located nearby.

Healthcare
North 24 Parganas district has been identified as one of the areas where ground water is affected by arsenic contamination.

References

Cities and towns in North 24 Parganas district